This is about the American entertainment executive born in 1959. For similarly named people, see William Campbell (disambiguation)

Billy Campbell (born November 23, 1959, in Columbia, South Carolina) is an American television executive producer.

Career
Sometime actor including a role in Project Greenlight, Campbell has held many executive posts, including Discovery Channel, where his dismissal was instrumental to the team terminating sponsorship of the Discovery Channel Pro Cycling Team.

On April 1, 2009, Campbell was named president and CEO of Panavision in Los Angeles, California.

Personal life
Campbell was one of the passengers on US Airways Flight 1549 which ditched in the Hudson River, adjacent to Manhattan, on January 15, 2009.

References

External links
 Billy Campbell, Yahoo TV

People from Columbia, South Carolina
1959 births
Living people
American television executives
American television producers
Discovery Channel people